Adhan (also variously transliterated as athan, adhane (in French), ajan/ajaan, azan/azaan (in South Asia), adzan (in Southeast Asia), and ezan (in Turkish), among other languages) is the Islamic call to public prayer (salah) in a mosque recited by a muezzin at prescribed times of the day.

Adhan is recited from the mosque five times daily, traditionally from the minaret. It is the first call summoning Muslims to enter the mosque for obligatory (fard) prayer (salah). A second call, known as the iqamah, summons those within the mosque to line up for the beginning of the prayers. Only in Turkey, Ezan is voiced in five different styles at different times; saba, uşşak, hicaz, rast, segah.

Terminology 
Adhān, Arabic for "announcement", from root ʾadhina meaning "to listen, to hear, be informed about", is variously transliterated in different cultures.

It is commonly written as athan, or adhane (in French), azan in Iran and south Asia (in Persian, Dari, Pashto, Hindi, Bengali, Urdu, and Punjabi), adzan in Southeast Asia (Indonesian and Malaysian), and ezan in Turkish. Muslims on the Malabar Coast in India use the Persian term بانگ, Banku, for the call to public prayer.

Another derivative of the word Adhān is ʾudhun, meaning "ear".

History

Announcer

The muezzin ( muʾaḏḏin) is the person who recites the Adhan from the mosque. Typically in modern times, this is done using a microphone: a recitation that is consequently broadcast to the speakers usually mounted on the higher part of the mosque's minarets, thus calling those nearby to prayer. However, in many mosques, the message can also be recorded. This is due to the fact that the "call to prayer" has to be done loudly and at least five times a day. This is usually done by replaying previously recorded "call to prayer" without the presence of a muezzin. This way, the mosque operator has the ability to edit or mix the message and adjust the volume of the message while also not having to hire a full-time muezzin or in case of the absence of a muezzin. This is why in many Muslim countries, the sound of the prayer call can be exactly identical between one mosque and another, as well as between one Salah hour and another, as is the case for the London Central Mosque. In the event of a religious holidays like Eid al-Fitr, for example in Indonesia, where the Kalimah (speech) has to be recited out loud all day long, mosque operators uses this recording method to create a looping recital of the Kalimah. 

The muezzin is chosen for his ability in reciting the Adhan clearly, melodically, and loudly enough for all people to hear. This is one of the important duties in the mosque, as his companions and community rely on him in his call for Muslims to come to pray in congregation. The Imam leads the prayer five times a day. The first muezzin in Islam was Bilal ibn Rabah, a freed slave of Abyssinian heritage.

Words

On rare occasions, the muezzin may say 'Sallu fi buyutikum (Pray in your homes) or Sallu fi rihaalikum (Pray in your dwellings) if it is raining heavily, if it is windy or if it is cold. Another case where this was said was during the COVID-19 lockdown. The phrase is usually said at the end of the adhan or he may skip Hayya ala salah and Hayya alal falah; other ways have also been narrated.

Religious views

Sunni

Sunnis state that the adhan was not written or said by the Islamic prophet, Muhammad, but by one of his Sahabah (his companions). Abdullah ibn Zayd, a sahabi of Muhammad, had a vision in his dream, in which the call for prayers was revealed to him by God. He later related this to his companions. Meanwhile, this news reached Muhammad, who confirmed it. Because of his stunning voice Muhammad chose a freed Habeshan slave by the name of Bilal ibn Rabah al-Habashi to make the call for prayers. Muhammad preferred the call better than the use of bells (as used by the Christians) and horns (as by the Jews).

During the Friday prayer (Salat al-Jumu'ah), there is one adhan but some Sunni Muslims increase it to two adhans; the first is to call the people to the mosque, the second is said before the Imam begins the khutbah (sermon). Just before the prayers start, someone amongst the praying people recites the iqama as in all prayers. The basis for this is that at the time of the Caliph Uthman he ordered two adhans to be made, the first of which was to be made in the marketplace to inform the people that the Friday prayer was soon to begin, and the second adhan would be the regular one held in the mosque. Not all Sunnis prefer two adhans as the need for warning the people of the impending time for prayer is no longer essential now that the times for prayers are well known.

Shia

Shia sources state Muhammad, according to God's command, ordered the adhan as a means of calling Muslims to prayer. Shia Islam teaches that no one else contributed, or had any authority to contribute, towards the composition of the adhan.

Shia sources also narrate that Bilal ibn Rabah al-Habashi was, in fact, the first person to recite the Adhan publicly out loud in front of the Muslim congregation.

The fundamental phrase lā ʾilāha ʾillā llāh is the foundation stone of Islam along with the belief in it. It declares that "there is no god but the God". This is the confession of Tawhid or the "doctrine of Oneness [of God]".

The phrase Muḥammadun rasūlu -llāh fulfills the requirement that there should be someone to guide in the name of God, which states Muhammad is God's Messenger. This is the acceptance of prophethood or Nabuwat of Muhammad.

Muhammad declared Ali ibn Abi Talib as his successor, at Ghadir Khumm, which was required for the continuation of his guidance. According to the hadith of the pond of Khumm, Muhammad stated that "Of whomsoever I am the authority, Ali is his authority". Hence, it is recommended to recite the phrase ʿalīyun walī -llāh ("Ali is His [God's] Authority").

In one of the Qiblah of Ma'ad al-Mustansir Billah (1035–1094) of Fatemi era masjid of Qahira (Mosque of Ibn Tulun) engraved his name and kalimat ash-shahādah as lā ʾilāha ʾillā -llāh, muḥammadun rasūlu -llāh, ʿalīyun walīyu -llāh.

Adhan reminds Muslims of these three Islamic teaching Tawhid, Nabuwat and Imamate before each prayer. These three emphasise devotion to God, Muhammad and Imam, which are considered to be so linked together that they can not be viewed separately; one leads to other and finally to God.

The phrase is optional to some Shia as justified above. They feel that Ali's Walayah ("Divine Authority") is self-evident, a testification and need not be declared. However, the greatness of God is also taken to be self-evident, but Muslims still declare Allāhu ʾakbar to publicize their faith. This is the reason that the most Shia give for the recitation of the phrase regarding Ali.

Dua (supplication)

Sunni
While listening to the Adhan, Sunni Muslims repeat the same words silently, except when the Adhan reciter (muezzin) says: "" or "" (ḥayya ʿalā ṣ-ṣalāh or ḥayya ʿala l-falāḥ) they silently say: "" (lā ḥawla wa lā quwwata ʾillā bi-llāh) (there is no strength or power except from God).

Immediately following the Adhan, Sunni Muslims recite the following dua (supplications):

1. A testimony:

2. An invocation of blessings on Muhammad:

3. Muhammad's name is invoked requested:

4. Dua are then made directly to God, between the adhan and the iqamaah.

According to Abu Dawud, Muhammad said: "Repeat the words of the mu'azzin and when you finish, ask God what you want and you will get it".

Shia
While listening to the Adhan, Shia Muslims repeat the same words silently, except when the Adhan reciter (muezzin) says: "" and "" (ʾašhadu ʾan lā ʾilāha ʾillā -llāh and ʾašhadu ʾanna Muḥammadan rasūlu -llāh) they silently say:

Whenever Muhammad's name is mentioned in the Adhan or Iqama, Shia Muslims recite salawat, a form of the peace be upon him  blessing specifically for Muhammad.

Immediately following the Adhan, Shia Muslims sit and recite the following dua (supplication):

Form
The call to prayer is said after entering the time of prayer. The muezzin usually stands during the call to prayer. It is common for the muezzin to put his hands to his ears when reciting the Adhan. Each phrase is followed by a longer pause and is repeated one or more times according to fixed rules. During the first statement each phrase is limited in tonal range, less melismatic, and shorter. Upon repetition the phrase is longer, ornamented with melismas, and may possess a tonal range of over an octave. The adhan's form is characterised by contrast and contains twelve melodic passages which move from one to another tonal center of one maqam a fourth or fifth apart. Various geographic regions in the Middle East traditionally perform the Adhan in particular maqamat: Medina, Saudi Arabia uses Maqam Bayati while Mecca uses Maqam Hijaz. The tempo is mostly slow; it may be faster and with fewer melismas for the sunset prayer. During festivals, it may be performed antiphonally as a duet.

Modern legal status

Australia
There are controversies due to community-centric disagreements at mosques in Australia, such as ongoing parking disputes at Al Zahra in Arncliffe,  noise complaints at Gallipoli Mosque and Lakemba Mosque in Sydney, and public filming at Albanian Australian Islamic Society and the Keysborough Turkish Islamic and Cultural Centre in Melbourne.

Bangladesh
In 2016, opposition leader Khaleda Zia alleged the government was preventing the broadcasting of adhans through loudspeakers, with government officials citing security concerns for the prime minister Sheikh Hasina".

Israel
In 2016, Israel's ministerial committee approved a draft bill that limits the volume of the use of public address systems for calls to prayer, particularly outdoor loudspeakers for adhaan, citing it as a factor of noise pollution, the draft bill was never enacted and has been in limbo ever since.  The bill was submitted by Knesset member Motti Yogev of the far right Zionist party Jewish Home and Robert Ilatov of the right wing Yisrael Beiteinu. The ban is meant to affect three mosques in Abu Dis village of East Jerusalem, disbarring them from broadcasting the morning call (fajr) prayers. The bill was backed by Prime Minister Benjamin Netanyahu who said: "I cannot count the times — they are simply too numerous — that citizens have turned to me from all parts of Israeli society, from all religions, with complaints about the noise and suffering caused to them by the excessive noise coming to them from the public address systems of houses of prayer." The Israel Democracy Institute, a non-partisan think tank, expressed concerns that it specifically stifles the rights of Muslims, and restricts their freedom of religion.

Turkey
As an extension of the reforms brought about by the establishment of the Republic of Turkey in 1923, the Turkish government at the time, encouraged by Atatürk, introduced secularism to Turkey.  The program involved implementing a Turkish adhan program as part of its goals, as opposed to the conventional Arabic call to prayer. Following the conclusion of said debates, on the 1 February 1932, the Adhan was chanted in Turkish and the practice was continued for a period of 18 years. There was some resistance against the Adhan in Turkish language and protests surged. In order to suppress these protests, in 1941, a new law was issued, under which people who chanted the Adhan in Arabic could be imprisoned for up to 3 months and be fined up to 300 Turkish Lira.

On 17 June 1950, a new government led by Adnan Menderes, restored Arabic as the liturgical language.

Sweden
The Fittja Mosque in Botkyrka, south of Stockholm, was in 2013 the first mosque to be granted permission for a weekly public call to Friday prayer, on condition that the sound volume does not exceed 60 dB. In Karlskrona (province of Blekinge, southern Sweden) the Islamic association built a minaret in 2017 and has had weekly prayer calls since then. The temporary mosque in Växjö filed for a similar permission in February 2018, which sparked a nationwide debate about the practice. A yearlong permission was granted by the Swedish Police Authority in May the same year.

Kuwait and UAE
During the outbreak of the coronavirus in 2019-2020 and the resulting viral pandemic, some cities in Kuwait changed their adhan from the usual hayya 'ala as-salah, meaning "come to prayer", to as-salatu fi buyutikum meaning "pray in your homes" or ala sallu fi rihalikum meaning "pray where you are".

Other Muslim countries (notably Saudi Arabia, Malaysia and Indonesia) also made this change because Muslims are prohibited to pray in mosques during the pandemic as preventive measures to stop the chain of the outbreak. The basis for the authority to change a phrase in the adhan was justified by the Prophet Muhammad's instructions while calling for adhan during adverse conditions.

Tajikistan 
The usage of loudspeakers to broadcast the adhan was banned in 2009 with Law No. 489 of 26 March 2009 on Freedom of Conscience and Religious Unions.

Uzbekistan 
In 2005, former Uzbek president Islam Karimov banned the Muslim call to prayer from being broadcast in the country; the ban was lifted in November 2017 by his successor, Shavkat Mirziyoyev.

In other countries, there is no written law forbidding the distribution of the call to prayer in mosques and prayer halls.

In popular culture

In television 
In some Muslim-majority countries, television stations usually broadcasts the adhan at prayer times, in a similar fashion to radio stations. In Indonesia and Malaysia, it is mandatory for all television stations to broadcast the adhan at Fajr and Magrib prayers, with the exception of non-Muslim religious stations. Islamic religious stations often broadcast the adhan at all five prayer times.

The adhan are commonly broadcast with a visual cinematic sequence depicting mosques and worshippers attending to the prayer. Some television stations in both Malaysia and Indonesia often utilize a more artistic or cultural approach to the cinematic involving multiple actors and religious-related plotlines.

The 1991-1994 recording of Masjid al-Haram muezzin, Sheikh Ali Ahmed Mulla is best known for its use in various television and radio stations.

Turkish National Anthem 
The adhan is referenced in the eighth verse of İstiklâl Marşı, the Turkish national anthem:

"The Armed Man" 
The adhan appears in "The Armed Man: A Mass For Peace" composed by Karl Jenkins.

See also

 Barechu - Jewish call to prayer
 Church bells - Christian call to prayer
 Dhikr
 Tashahhud

References

External links

Adhan from the Grand Mosque (Masjid al Haram) recited by Sheikh Ali Ahmed Mulla
Adhan from the Prophet's Mosque (Masjid Nabawi), Madinah al Munawarah
Adhan (call for prayer) from a mosque
Tweaking the Azaan and other measures Muslim countries have taken to combat the virus
 Meaning of the Adhan
 Ezan video at Hagia Sophia
https://sunnah.com/abudawud:1062
 https://sunnah.com/mishkat:1055

Articles containing video clips
Salah terminology